Thomas N. Sato is a prominent Japanese educator, entrepreneur, and biologist, whose research focuses on understanding molecular basis of cancer, cardiac disease and metabolic diseases by using a number of animal models including mice, zebrafish and fruit flies. He is also working to invent next-generation therapeutics for human diseases based on the stochastic basis of life and disease. 
He is currently director of the Thomas N. Sato BioMEC-X Laboratories at the Advanced Telecommunications Research Institute International (ATR) in Kyoto, research director of the ERATO Sato Live Bio-forecasting project JST in Kyoto, scientific founder and chair of board of directors Karydo TherapeutiX, Inc, professor of Virtual Human InformatiX Clinic in Nara,  and affiliate professor at Centenary Institute in Sydney, Australia. He is also a triathlete who competes at Ironman distance including Ironman Lake Placid, Ironman Japan, Ironman Coeur d’Alene.

Life
 University of Tsukuba, Japan, BS 1985 
 Georgetown University, Graduate School of Biological Sciences/Neuroscience, Ph.D. 1988 
 Scripps Research Institute, Postdoctoral Fellow 1989-1990 
 Roche Institute of Molecular Biology, Assistant Member 1991-1995 
 Harvard Medical School, Assistant Professor 1995-1997 
 Univ. of Texas Southwestern Medical School, Associate Professor 1997-2001 (Tenured in 1999) 
 Univ. of Texas Southwestern Medical School, Professor 2002-2004 
 Weill Medical College of Cornell University, Professor 2005-2006 
 Weill Medical College of Cornell University, Joseph C. Hinsey Professor 2005-2009 
 Nara Institute of Science and Technology Graduate School of Biological Sciences, Japan, Professor 2009
 Cornell University, Biomedical Engineering, Adjunct Professor 2009–2019
 Centenary Institute, Sydney, Australia, Affiliate Professor 2009–present

Works
Discoveries of Tie1, Tie2, and angiopoietins, that play the key roles in the blood vessel formation.

Awards
 National Science Contest for Elementary School Students, 1st-place winner, Japan, 1973
 Cold Spring Harbor Summer Fellowship, Cold Spring Harbor Laboratories, Cold Spring Harbor, NY 1998
 American Heart Association,  Established Investigator Award, USA 1998-2003
 Japanese Endocrinology and Cardiovascular Society, Jokichi Takamine Research Award, Japan 2005
 Listed among top 1% most cited authors for journals in Molecular Biology and Genetics 2006
 Scientific Advisory Board Member, Surface Logix, Inc. 2006-2008

References

External links
 NAIST-Biological Science Biodynamics and Integrative Biology
 Laboratory of Biodynamics and Integrative Biology

Japanese biologists
Academic staff of Nara Institute of Science and Technology
University of Tsukuba alumni
Living people
1962 births
Georgetown University alumni